Grande Terre is the largest and principal island of New Caledonia, which is a territory of France.

History
Until about 37 million years ago, the island was completely submerged under the ocean.

British explorer James Cook sighted Grande Terre in 1774 and named it "New Caledonia", Caledonia being the Latin name for what is now Scotland. The island's mountains reminded him of Scotland. Eventually, the name "New Caledonia" became applied to Grande Terre and its surrounding islands.

It was annexed by the French Empire and became a penal colony in 1853. Today, Grande Terre has about 268,000 residents.

Geography
The largest settlement on Grande Terre is Nouméa, the capital city of New Caledonia. Locals refer to Grand Terre as "Le Caillou", the pebble. The island has a fairly hot and humid climate, though varying as the south-east trade winds bring relatively cool air. Surrounding the island and especially to the north-west is the New Caledonian barrier reef.

The highest point is Mont Panié at  elevation. Grande Terre is one of the largest islands in the Pacific Ocean.

Notes

Islands of New Caledonia